The 2017 Tirreno–Adriatico was a road cycling stage race that took place between 8 and 14 March. It was the 52nd edition of the Tirreno–Adriatico and was the seventh event of the 2017 UCI World Tour.

Quintana took the race lead after winning the queen stage of the race to Monte Terminillo, and maintained it to the end of the race, ultimately winning by 25 seconds over  rider Rohan Dennis, who won the final individual time trial stage as well as being part of the opening stage-winning team time trial. The podium was completed by 's Thibaut Pinot, a further 11 seconds in arrears of Dennis.

In the race's other classifications, 's Peter Sagan won the points classification after two stage victories, a second-place stage finish and a third place;  rider Davide Ballerini won the mountains classification, while Bob Jungels overtook Egan Bernal for the victory in the young rider classification, overhauling him in the final time trial. Quintana's  won the teams classification with Jonathan Castroviejo also placing in the top ten overall.

Teams
As Tirreno–Adriatico is a UCI World Tour event, all eighteen UCI WorldTeams were invited automatically and obliged to enter a team in the race. Four UCI Professional Continental teams competed, completing the 22-team peloton.

Route
The route of the 2017 Tirreno–Adriatico was announced on 15 December 2016.

Stages

Stage 1
8 March 2017 — Lido di Camaiore to Lido di Camaiore, team time trial (TTT)

For the second year in succession,  sealed victory on the opening day, as the American team recorded a time some 16 seconds faster than their closest rivals, . Leading the team over the line was Italian rider Damiano Caruso, which enabled him to receive the first blue jersey for the general classification leader. The team's overall contenders Tejay van Garderen and Rohan Dennis were amongst the sextet at the finish, taking an early advantage over their rivals.

The team time trial was marred by a crash suffered by  rider Gianni Moscon, when his front wheel disintegrated at high speed. Moscon fell to the tarmac, suffering abrasions, but was able to remount.

Stage 2
9 March 2017 — Camaiore to Pomarance, 

Ewan was later forced to abandon, and joined teammate Roger Kluge on the sidelines after he had earlier abandoned earlier in the day.

Inside of  remaining, 's Bob Jungels and Geraint Thomas attacked on the 16% steep climb towards Pomarance, pulling Tim Wellens, and  duo Tejay van Garderen and Damiano Caruso – in the leader's blue jersey – away with them.

Stage 3
10 March 2017 — Monterotondo Marittimo to Montalto di Castro, 

A group of riders that included Andriy Hrivko, Alexis Gougeard, Mattia Frapporti, Mirco Maestri and Luca Wackermann, Iuri Filosi and Kohei Uchima broke clear of the peloton in the early kilometres, with a gap of over three minutes ahead of the day's only categorised climb, at Scansano. Just as he had done the previous day, Maestri took maximum points at the pair of intermediate sprint points on the route, but the peloton was still pulling the breakaway back, and the field was as one again, with around  remaining.

There was a crash in the final kilometres of the stage that took down 's main sprinter, Fernando Gaviria, and delaying numerous other riders as well – with the crash coming within the final , all riders in the group were given the same time as the stage winner. At the finish, the world champion Peter Sagan took his first victory of the season, edging out Elia Viviani and Jürgen Roelandts in a sprint to the line. With race leader Greg Van Avermaet among those that were delayed by the Gaviria crash, he ceded the race lead – for the third leader in as many days – to teammate Rohan Dennis.

Stage 4
11 March 2017 — Montalto di Castro to Monte Terminillo,

Stage 5
12 March 2017 — Rieti to Fermo,

Stage 6
13 March 2017 — Ascoli Piceno to Civitanova Marche,

Stage 7
14 March 2017 — San Benedetto del Tronto to San Benedetto del Tronto, individual time trial (ITT)

Classification leadership table
In the 2017 Tirreno–Adriatico, four jerseys were awarded. The general classification was calculated by adding each cyclist's finishing times on each stage. Time bonuses were awarded to the first three finishers on all stages except for the individual time trial: the stage winner won a ten-second bonus, with six and four seconds for the second and third riders respectively. Bonus seconds were also awarded to the first three riders at intermediate sprints; three seconds for the winner of the sprint, two seconds for the rider in second and one second for the rider in third. The leader of the general classification received a blue jersey. This classification was considered the most important of the 2017 Tirreno–Adriatico, and the winner of the classification was considered the winner of the race.

The second classification was the points classification. Riders were awarded points for finishing in the top ten in a stage. Unlike in the points classification in the Tour de France, the winners of all stages – with the exception of the team time trial, which awarded no points towards the classification – were awarded the same number of points. Points were also won in intermediate sprints; five points for crossing the sprint line first, three points for second place, two for third and one for fourth. The leader of the points classification was awarded a red jersey.

There was also a mountains classification, for which points were awarded for reaching the top of a climb before other riders. Each climb was categorised as either Superior-, or single-category, with more points available for the more difficult, Superior-category climb, Monte Terminillo. For Monte Terminillo, the top seven riders earned points; on the other climbs, only the top four riders earned points. The leadership of the mountains classification was marked by a green jersey.

The fourth jersey represented the young rider classification, marked by a white jersey. Only riders born after 1 January 1992 were eligible; the young rider best placed in the general classification was the leader of the young rider classification. There was also a classification for teams, in which the times of the best three cyclists in a team on each stage were added together; the leading team at the end of the race was the team with the lowest cumulative time.

Final classification standings

General classification

Points classification

Mountains classification

Young rider classification

Teams classification

References

Sources

External links
 

Tirreno–Adriatico
Tirreno-Adriatico
Tirreno-Adriatico
March 2017 sports events in Italy